North Sarasota is a census-designated place (CDP) in Sarasota County, Florida, United States. The population was 6,982 at the 2010 census. It is part of the Bradenton–Sarasota–Venice Metropolitan Statistical Area.

Geography
North Sarasota is located at  (27.366855, -82.512903).

Demographics

As of the census of 2000, there were 6,738 people, 2,770 households, and 1,792 families residing in the CDP. The racial makeup of the CDP was 63.86% White, 30.74% African American, 0.27% Native American, 0.49% Asian, 0.03% Pacific Islander, 2.97% from other races, and 1.65% from two or more races. Hispanic or Latino of any race were 8.77% of the population.

There were 2,770 households, out of which 23.4% had children under the age of 18 living with them, 44.9% were married couples living together, 15.1% had a female householder with no husband present, and 35.3% were non-families. 27.4% of all households were made up of individuals, and 14.4% had someone living alone who was 65 years of age or older.  The average household size was 2.43 and the average family size was 2.94.

In the CDP, the population was spread out, with 22.1% under the age of 18, 7.0% from 18 to 24, 24.3% from 25 to 44, 23.7% from 45 to 64, and 22.8% who were 65 years of age or older.  The median age was 43 years. For every 100 females, there were 92.0 males.  For every 100 females age 18 and over, there were 86.2 males.

The median income for a household in the CDP was $33,084, and the median income for a family was $36,629. Males had a median income of $26,383 versus $21,505 for females. The per capita income for the CDP was $17,643.  About 13.8% of families and 17.2% of the population were below the poverty line, including 32.0% of those under age 18 and 9.8% of those age 65 or over.

References

Census-designated places in Sarasota County, Florida
Sarasota metropolitan area
Census-designated places in Florida